Elections to Buckinghamshire County Council were held on 5 May 2005, alongside the 2005 UK General Election and other local elections in England and Northern Ireland. The entire council was up for election, with each successful candidate serving a four-year term of office, expiring in 2009.

The Conservative Party remained in overall control of the council, winning 44 out of 57 seats. 11 of the remaining seats were won by the Liberal Democrats, whilst the remaining 2 were won by Labour.

Result

	
The overall turnout was 65.4% with a total of 295,905 valid votes cast. A total of 2,397 ballots were rejected.

Council Composition
Following the last election in 2001 the composition of the council was:

After the election, the composition of the council was:

Ward Results

All results by ward are listed below. The turnout numbers recorded is the valid voter turnout, not the total number of ballots cast including those that were spoiled.

Abbey

Alderbourne

Amersham

Aston Clinton

Aylesbury East

Aylesbury North

Aylesbury South

Aylesbury South East

Aylesbury West

Beaconsfield

Bernwood

Booker, Cressex & Sands

Bowerdean, Micklefield & Totteridge

Buckingham North

Buckingham South

Bulstrode

Burnham Beeches

Chalfont St Peter

Chesham East

Chesham North West

Chess Valley

Chiltern Ridges

Chiltern Valley

Downley, Disraeli, Oakridge & Castlefield

Gerrards Cross & Denham North

Great Brickhill

Great Missenden

Greater Hughenden

Grendon Underwood

Haddenham

Hazelmere

Icknield and Bledlow

Iver

Ivinghoe

Marlow

Penn, Coleshill & Holmer Green

Ryemead, Tylers Green & Loudwater

Stoke Poges & Farnham Common

Stokenchurch, Radnage & West Wycombe

Taplow, Dorney & Lent Rise

Terriers & Amersham Hill

Thames

The Chalfonts & Seer Green

The Risboroughs

Wendover & Halton

Wing

Winslow

References

Buckinghamshire County Council elections
2005 English local elections
2000s in Buckinghamshire